Thomasia macrocalyx is a species of flowering plant in the family Malvaceae and is endemic to the south-west of Western Australia. It is an erect, bushy shrub with densely hairy new growth, egg-shaped leaves with a heart-shaped base and lobed or toothed edges, and groups of pale purple to mauve or white flowers.

Description
The edges of the leaves are toothed or lobed, both surfaces densly covered with star-shaped hairs, the upper surface becoming glabrous with age. The sepals are joined at the base and covered with both simple and star-shaped hairs. Flowering occurs from May to December.

Taxonomy and naming
Thomasia macrocalyx was first formally described in 1845 by Ernst Gottlieb von Steudel in Lehmann's Plantae Preissianae from specimens collected near Preston Beach. The specific epithet (macrocalyx) means "large calyx", referring to the sepals.

Distribution and habitat
This thomasia grows on sandplains, hills and breakaways, often near creeks or on slopes, mainly near the Darling Range in the Avon Wheatbelt, Esperance Plains, Geraldton Sandplains, Jarrah Forest, Mallee and Swan Coastal Plain bioregions of south-western Western Australia.

Conservation status
Thomasia macrocalyx is listed as "not threatened" by the Western Australian Government Department of Biodiversity, Conservation and Attractions.

References

macrocalyx
Rosids of Western Australia
Plants described in 1845
Taxa named by Ernst Gottlieb von Steudel